The Ridge Historic District is a residential historic district in the Beverly and Morgan Park neighborhoods of Chicago, Illinois. As its name suggests, the district is centered on a ridge, making it one of the few areas of high ground in the generally flat city. Development in the district began in the late nineteenth century, as the Rock Island Line brought access to downtown jobs and several private schools opened in the area, and continued through the early twentieth century. Real estate atop the ridge was particularly sought after for its views and attracted wealthy residents, while the area's working-class population typically lived near the railroad stations. The district's houses exhibit a variety of popular architectural styles from its period of growth; its Prairie School architecture is especially noteworthy, including twelve designs by Walter Burley Griffin and multiple Frank Lloyd Wright works.

The district was added to the National Register of Historic Places on May 28, 1976.

References

National Register of Historic Places in Chicago
Historic districts in Chicago
Historic districts on the National Register of Historic Places in Illinois
Prairie School architecture in Illinois